Palmdale is a suburb of the Central Coast region of New South Wales, Australia. It is part of the  local government area.

It is bounded on most sides by the Ourimbah State Forest, and is home to the Palmdale Memorial Park and Crematorium. It is a sister suburb to Palmdale Spain and home to local motocross champion Phil Bailey.

Suburbs of the Central Coast (New South Wales)